The Mayors and Independents, abbreviated to STAN, is a liberal to liberal conservative political party in the Czech Republic that is focused on localism, regionalism and subsidiarity.  The party grew out of four minor parties, including Independent Mayors for the Region, which allied itself with the liberal-conservative SNK European Democrats, and cooperated with the similarly liberal-conservative TOP 09 until 2016. It holds 33 seats in the Chamber of Deputies, and is the third strongest party by number of seats following the 2021 election.

In the 2013 election to the Chamber of Deputies, STAN won five seats on the TOP 09 list: Jan Farský, Stanislav Polčák, Věra Kovářová, František Vácha and acting leader Petr Gazdík.  In the Czech Senate, STAN has four members. The party competes separately in local government elections.  In the 2010 local elections, the party won 1,243 councillors, making it the sixth-largest party on local councils. In the 2017 election to the Chamber of Deputies, STAN won six seats: Petr Gazdík, Jan Farský, Věra Kovářová, Vít Rakušan, Martin Půta (who was replaced by Petr Pavek) and Jana Krutáková.

The party contested the 2021 Czech parliamentary election as part of the coalition Pirates and Mayors with the Czech Pirate Party.

History
STAN grew out of NSK (Nezávislí starostové pro kraj, Independent Mayors for the Region), founded in 2004 and transformed in 2009. Led by its first Leader Petr Gazdík and Deputy Leader Stanislav Polčák elected in 2009, STAN started co-operating with the liberal-conservative TOP 09 at all political levels; with Petr Gazdík leading the TOP 09 and STAN parliamentary group. In 2013, the said co-operation was de facto curtailed to the parliamentary level, i.e. was continued only in the Chamber of Deputies and the Senate. In 3/2014, Petr Gazdík was succeeded in the STAN leadership by Martin Půta (Governor, Liberecký Region); and became the First Deputy Leader deputised by Stanislav Polčák. Sharing common candidates standing in the 2014 European Parliament election, STAN and TOP 09 polled 15.95% of the votes and gained four seats with one being taken by STAN Deputy Leader Stanislav Polčák. In 2016, Martin Půta was succeeded by Petr Gazdík leading STAN into the regional and Senate elections. In 2019 Vít Rakušan was elected as a new leader. In 2020 STAN won the Senate elections (with 11 seats of 27 contested).

Manifesto
The party's top priorities include: good stewardship, high-quality education, environmental care and heritage protection – investing in education is key to the future prosperity that, however, must be built on the principles of good stewardship (management of public funds, use of energy resources and prudential landscape interventions). In promoting the principle of subsidiarity, STAN encourages localism, decentralisation, reduced bureaucracy and corruption clampdown. STAN further promotes: European integration, high-quality education, investments in science, state economy driven by the principles of a free market with the social aspect and sanctity of private property in mind, and environment protection.

Election results

Chamber of Deputies

Senate

1 By-election in Zlín district.
2 By-election in Trutnov district. 
3 By-election in Prague-9 district.

Presidential election

European Parliament

Regional election 

1 Does not include coalitions

Prague municipal elections

Leaders
 Josef Zicha (2005–2009)
 Petr Gazdík (2009–2014)
 Martin Půta (2014–2016)
 Petr Gazdík (2016–2019)
 Vít Rakušan (Since 2019)

Footnotes

External links
 Mayors and Independents official website

 
Centrist political parties in the Czech Republic
Centre-right parties in Europe
Liberal parties in the Czech Republic
Political parties established in 2004
Regionalist parties in the Czech Republic
Pro-European political parties in the Czech Republic
2004 establishments in the Czech Republic